SCEGGS Darlinghurst is an independent Anglican single-sex primary and secondary day and boarding school for girls, located in Darlinghurst, an inner-city, eastern suburb of Sydney, New South Wales, Australia.

Founded in 1895 as the Sydney Church of England Girls Grammar School, the school's official name was changed to SCEGGS Darlinghurst in 1995. The school has a non-selective enrolment policy and currently caters for approximately 890 students from Year K to Year 12. The school is regularly among the top-performing schools in New South Wales academically. While predominantly a day school, SCEGGS offers a small number of boarding places at St Vincent's College, Potts Point.

SCEGGS is affiliated with the Association of Heads of Independent Schools of Australia (AHISA), the Junior School Heads Association of Australia (JSHAA), the Alliance of Girls' Schools Australasia (AGSA), and is a founding member of the Association of Heads of Independent Girls' Schools (AHIGS).

In 2001, The Sun-Herald ranked SCEGGS Darlinghurst second in Australia's top ten girls' schools, based on the number of its alumnae mentioned in the Who's Who in Australia (a listing of notable Australians).

History 
On 17 July 1895, a grammar school for girls was officially opened in Sydney under the auspices of the Sydney Diocese of the Church of England. The Sydney Church of England Girls' Grammar School (abbreviated as S.C.E.G.G.S.) commenced in a terrace house at 65 (now 55) Victoria Street, Darlinghurst with one pupil, Mary Watson, one teacher, Miss Janet Uther, and the Principal, Miss Edith Badham. Within a year, the school had increased to 50 pupils enrolled, and moved to "Chatsworth", a larger home in Macleay Street.

By 1900, the school had 100 pupils, including a Kindergarten and junior school. "Barham" in Forbes Street, Darlinghurst was purchased and the school moved there in 1901. The curriculum at the time included English Language and Literature, Geography, Modern and Ancient History, Latin, Classical Greek, Mathematics, French Language and Literature, German or Italian, Needlework and Drilling. Classes in Botany, Geology or other scientific subjects, were also offered to pupils who reached a fair standard of proficiency in their ordinary subjects. Classes in Cookery and Dressmaking were held whenever there was sufficient demand.

S.C.E.G.G.S. continued to expand and several branch schools were opened – Bowral (1906–1929) relocated to Moss Vale (1930–1974), Hunters Hill (1912–1915), North Sydney (1911–1941) becoming Redlands (1945–1976), Wollongong (1955–1976) and Loquat Valley (1967–1976).

In 1974, financial difficulties arose due to the controller of the Anglican Diocesan schools misappropriating school funds, threatening the school with closure. Within two years, contributions from the school community and the Sydney Diocese ensured that the original school, S.C.E.G.G.S. Darlinghurst, was not closed but continued to operate. Moss Vale was forced to close in 1974, and two years later, Redlands, Wollongong and Loquat Valley became schools independent from S.C.E.G.G.S. Darlinghurst, and have been governed by their own boards ever since.

A not-for-profit company limited by guarantee, S.C.E.G.G.S. Darlinghurst Ltd, was formed in 1976, under a Board of Directors, to govern the school. On the school's Centenary in 1995, the school changed its name from Sydney Church of England Girls' Grammar School, Darlinghurst (S.C.E.G.G.S.) to SCEGGS Darlinghurst.

Principals

Campus
SCEGGS Darlinghurst has expanded from a terrace house in 1895 to a campus incorporating a chapel, primary school, classroom blocks, assembly hall, science and library block, auditorium, sports hall, senior study building, lecture theatre, play house, Great Hall and performing arts centre and many more. From 1965 to 1983, a preparatory school was operated at Bellevue Hill for boys and girls up to Kindergarten age. A new music centre has also been added, including a renovated church to be used for performances etc.

House system
The house system was introduced in 1926 by Miss Wilkinson to help generate school spirit and sporting enthusiasm, encourage good conduct and to provide girls with opportunities for taking on responsibility. House competitions are held in various sports, in music, drama, science and debating.

 Badhamnamed after Edith Badham, first headmistress (1895–1920) and founder and first president of the Old Girl's Union. Colours: red and gold. 
 Bartonnamed after Edmund Barton, first Prime Minister of Australia (1901–1903), Justice of the High Court (1903–1920) and father of Jean "Muffie" Barton, pupil 1895–1899. Colours: red and white.
 Becknamed after Ernest Beck, member of the school council (1895–1906) and second school chaplain (1901–1928). Colours: blue and gold.
 Christiannamed after Lydia Christian, member of the school council (1897–1919) and mother of Lilian Mary Christian, pupil 1895–1896. Colours: red and black.
 Dockernamed after Wilfred Law Docker, first treasurer of the school council (1895–1919). Colours: blue and black.
 Langleynamed after John Douse Langley, first secretary of the school council (1894–1927) and bishop of Bendigo (1907–1919). Colours: green and gold.

Notable alumnae 

Media, entertainment and the arts
 Ethel Anderson - writer and painter
 Gillian Armstrong – film director
 Sally Bowrey – TV presenter / producer
 Blanche d'Alpuget – biographer
 Anne Davies – Sydney Morning Herald journalist and MEAA identity
 Tania Davis – musician
 Ursula Dubosarsky – author
 Celina Edmonds – TV news presenter
 Susanne Gervay – author
 Claudia Karvan – actress
 Julie McCrossin – MC/comedian
 Pamela Stephenson – comedian and therapist
 Zoe Terakes -  actor 
 Sarah Wynter – actor

Medicine and science
Elizabeth Elliott  – Professor of Paediatrics, Sydney University
Joan Freeman – nuclear physicist, Rutherford Medal and Prize winner
Tanya Monro – physicist, academic
Vera Ramaciotti – philanthropist (established the Clive and Vera Ramaciotti Foundation for biomedical research)

Politics, public service and the law
 Virginia Bell – a Puisne Justice of the High Court of Australia, since 2009
 Liz Kernohan – Liberal politician
 Olive Kelso King – World War I ambulance driver
 Kay Patterson – Liberal senator and former health minister
 Esme Tombleson – Member of Parliament in New Zealand, and multiple sclerosis advocate
 Margaret Whitlam  (née Dovey) – champion swimmer, social worker, wife of the 21st Prime Minister of Australia, Gough Whitlam, and a former Australian National Living Treasure

Business
Kirstin Ferguson – Company director, Deputy Chair of Australian Broadcasting Corporation
Roxy Jacenko- Businesswoman
Sport
 Samantha Marshall – swimmer, Commonwealth Games silver medallist and Malcolm Fraser's granddaughter
 Amy Parmenter - netballer
 Freda Du Faur - Mountaineer, credited as the first woman to climb New Zealand's tallest mountain, Aoraki / Mount Cook

See also 

 Anglican education in Australia
 List of Anglican schools in New South Wales
 List of people educated at SCEGGS Darlinghurst
 Sydney Anglican Schools Corporation

Notes
  Who's Who of girls' school rankings: 1.SCEGGS Darlinghurst 2. Ascham, 3.MLC Melbourne, 4.PLC Sydney, 5.Melbourne Girls Grammar School, 6.Mac.Robertson Girls' High School, 7.North Sydney Girls High School, 8.Sydney Girls High School, 9.MLC Sydney, 10.University High School, Melbourne

References

External links 
 

Anglican Diocese of Sydney
Educational institutions established in 1895
Anglican primary schools in Sydney
Anglican secondary schools in Sydney
Girls' schools in New South Wales
Association of Heads of Independent Girls' Schools
Junior School Heads Association of Australia Member Schools
1895 establishments in Australia
Darlinghurst, New South Wales
Alliance of Girls' Schools Australasia